Shomilan or Shemilan may refer to:
 Shemilan, Kerman
 Shomilan, Khuzestan